Majd ad-Din may refer to:

Majd al-Din Abu'l Fotuh Ahmad Ghazali (1061 – c. 1123), Persian Sufi writer and preacher
Majd ad-Dīn Usāma ibn Murshid ibn ʿAlī ibn Munqidh al-Kināni, or more briefly Usama ibn Munqidh (1095–1188), Syrian poet
Majd ad-Dīn Ibn Athir (1149–1210), Kurdish lexicographer
Abu-t-Tahir Ibn Ibrahim Majd ud-Din ul-Fairuzabadi (1329–1414), Arab lexicographer
Majduddin (fl. 1780-90), Indian Muslim theologian
, Iranian Shia Cleric
Majed Aldin Ghazal (born 1987), Syrian high jumper